Indira En Selvam is a 1962 Indian Tamil-language drama film, directed by C. Padmanaban and produced by S. Soundappan and C. Chenna Kesavan. The film's script was written by Viruthai Ramasamy, with music by C. N. Padurangan and H. R. Pathmanabha Sastri. The film stars Baby Sumangala, Pandari Bai, M. R. Radha and S. A. Ashokan, with Nagesh A. Karunanidhi, Gemini Chandra and C. Lakshmi Rajyam in supporting roles. The film was an average success.

Plot
Indra is a child whose mother dies in labour. A kindhearted nurse brings her up as her own child. The nurse's life becomes increasingly unbearable as she is harassed by the advances of a villainous doctor. Left with no choice, she moves to another town, where she joins a hospital. As part of the condition of employment, she declares that she has no dependents. Thus the child is left alone in school, The children at the school taunt her for being an orphan and not knowing who her father was. In sheer despair, the little girl writes a letter to her father "Care Of God". Much to her surprise and delight, she receives a toy as a gift with her father's name on the package. With justifiable pride, she shows the toy to her friends. Using the child, the villain tries to blackmail the nurse. After many hurdles, the child is saved from his clutches by the nurse and her doctor-lover. The film ends with the couple marrying and adopting Indra.

Cast
Cast according to the opening credits of the film and the songbook:

Male cast
Nadigavel M. R. Radha as Karunamurthi, Karunakaran
S. A. Ashokan  as Doctor Sekar
A. Karunanidhi as Compounder Kailasam
Nagesh as Rayappan
P. C. Kittan as Post Master
T. K. Sampangi as Homeowner
A. P. S. Mani as Sub-Inspector

Female cast
Pandari Bai as Sushila
Gemini Chandra as Prabha
Pushpamala as Malathi
Saradambal as Kaveri Ammal
Surya Prabha as Vasantha
Baby Sumangala as Indira

Dance
 Lakshmirajyam
Bharatha Natyam
 Suryaprabha
 Meenakumari

Soundtrack
Music was composed by C. N. Pandurangan and H. R. Pathmanabha Sastri. The lyrics were written by Suratha, Thamizhaazhagan, Va. Su. Ra., Kovai Kumarathevan and Villiputhan. Playback singers are P. B. Srinivas, S. C. Krishnan, A. L. Raghavan, (Radha) Jayalakshmi, K. Rani, Soolamangalam Rajalakshmi, Soolamangalam Jayalakshmi and A. G. Rathnamala.
The comedy number by S. C. Krishnan and A. G. Rathnamala attracted attention. Inbam Kondadum Maalai, a duet by P. B. Srinivas and K. Rani, became a hit.

References

External links

1960s Tamil-language films
1962 drama films
1962 films
Films about babies
Indian black-and-white films
Indian children's films
Indian drama films
Films scored by C. N. Pandurangan
Films scored by H. R. Padmanabha Sastry